Bold Films is an American independent film, television and live stage development, production and finance company. Bold was founded in 2004.

Bold's first three films were Slingshot, Come Early Morning and Mini's First Time.  In 2006 the company had its first hit, producing and financing the Golden Globe-nominated period piece Bobby, written and directed by Emilio Estevez. In 2009 Bold produced and released Joe Dante's 3D thriller The Hole, which won an award for Best 3D Film at the Venice Film Festival. Roger Ebert called the best use of 3D ever.  In 2010 Bold had its first major studio film Legion, which was co-financed and released by Screen Gems, a division of Sony Pictures Entertainment.  In 2011 Bold co-produced and co-financed with OddLot Entertainment Drive starring Ryan Gosling and Carey Mulligan, for which director Nicolas Winding Refn won the Best Director Award at the Cannes Film Festival while also receiving accolades from the BAFTA Awards, The Golden Globes and Academy Awards. In 2014 the company produced and financed Nightcrawler starring Jake Gyllenhaal, and Whiplash with Blumhouse Productions, which received five Academy Award nominations, including Best Picture. Other awards nominations for the film include the Spirit Awards, PGA Awards, SAG Awards, and WGA Awards.

The company also produces content for television, including the short-lived ABC series Black Box, and the Syfy series Dominion.

In February 2015, Bold Films opened offices in London, England which Bold Films closed in 2018 after the completion of the UK production "Colette", which starred Keira Knightley and Dominic West. "Colette" was nominated for Best Screenplay at the Independent Spirit Awards that year.

In 2021, Bold Films produced and financed "The Guilty”, directed by Antoine Fuqua and starring Jake Gyllenhaal which was released on Netflix. This adaptation of the Sundance Audience Award winning Danish film “Den Skyldige”, was seen by 69 million households in the first 28 days on the platform. Bold Films also produced the Emmy nominated “Oslo” in 2021, which was based on the Tony-winning play of the same name.

Filmography

References

External links
 Official website

Film production companies of the United States
Entertainment companies based in California
Companies based in Los Angeles
Entertainment companies established in 2007
2007 establishments in California
Privately held companies based in California
American independent film studios